February 2016 Diyarbakır bombing
 March 2016 Diyarbakır bombing
 May 2016 Diyarbakır bombing
 November 2016 Diyarbakır bombing